The Ballade in D minor, Op. 15 (B. 139), is a ballade for violin and piano, composed by Antonín Dvořák in 1884. As with the third piano trio, the Scherzo capriccioso, the Hussite Overture, and the seventh symphony, composed in the same period, the work is written in a more dramatic, dark and aggressive style that supersedes the carefree folk style of Dvořák's "Slavonic period".

A typical performance lasts 6 minutes.

References

External links 
 
 , performed by Josef Suk and Josef Hála

1884 compositions
Compositions in D minor
Chamber music by Antonín Dvořák
Compositions for violin and piano
Ballades (music)